Broken Flesh is the third studio album from Broken Flesh. Luxor Records released the album on September 4, 2015.

Critical reception

Awarding the album three and a half stars for About.com, Chad Bowar states, "The album is brutally heavy, but not monotonous." Dan Slessor, rating the album a nine out of ten at Outburn, writes, the songs are "visceral in the extreme." Giving the album a 6.6 out of ten from Pure Grain Audio, Graham Finney says, "The saving grace for Broken Flesh is that, while they may be another generic brutal death metal act, their crushing heaviness is delivered with such pinpoint accuracy that long-standing fans of the genre will find plenty on this self-titled offering to keep them headbanging long into the night." Pagan Hel, indicating in a four star review by RAM Zine, describes, "Broken Flesh sure know how to engage with their skilled savagery, even if it does hold a (slight) Christian message."

Track listing

Credits
Broken Flesh
 Brandon Lopez – drums
 Jacob Mathes – vocals
 Joshua Mathes – bass, backing vocals
 Kevin Tubby – guitar, backing vocals

Production
 Colin Davis – mastering
 Nick Morris – engineer, additional guitar
 Jon Zig – artwork, layout

References

2015 albums
Broken Flesh albums